Agia Marina is village on the island of Lesbos, North Aegean, Greece. Since the 2019 local government reform it is part of the municipality of Mytilene.

References

Populated places in Lesbos